Mictopsichia cubilgruitza is a species of moth of the family Tortricidae. It is found in Guatemala.

The wingspan is about 14 mm. The ground colour of the forewings is pale brownish, but orange in terminal area and paler orange along the costa. The hindwings are orange with brownish apical markings.

Etymology
The name refers to the type locality, Cubilgruitz.

References

Moths described in 2009
Mictopsichia
Moths of Central America
Taxa named by Józef Razowski